This is a list of lakes and reservoirs in Norway, sorted by county.

For the geography and history of lakes in that country, see Lakes in Norway, including:
List of largest lakes in Norway
List of deepest lakes in Norway

Akershus

Bjørkelangen
Bogstadvannet
Dælivannet
Engervannet
Hallangen
Hurdalsjøen
Lyseren
Mangen
Mjøsa
Øgderen
Østernvann
Øyangen (Gran)
Øyeren
Rødenessjøen
Setten

Aust-Agder

Åraksfjorden
Blåsjø
Botnsvatnet
Botsvatn
Breidvatn
Byglandsfjorden
Fisstøylvatnet
Grøssæ
Gyvatn
Hartevatnet
Herefossfjorden
Holmavatnet
Holmevatnet
Homstølvatnet
Hovatn
Høvringsvatnet
Kilefjorden
Kolsvatnet
Kvifjorden
Longerakvatnet
Måvatn
Myklevatnet
Nasvatn
Nelaug
Nesvatn
Nystølfjorden
Ogge
Ormsavatnet
Østre Grimevann
Øyarvatnet
Ramvatn
Reinevatn
Rore
Rosskreppfjorden
Sæsvatn
Skyvatn
Store Bjørnevatn
Store Urevatn
Straumsfjorden
Svartevatnet
Syndle
Topsæ
Uldalsåna
Vatndalsvatnet
Vegår

Buskerud

Bjornesfjorden
Brommafjorden
Damtjern (Ringerike)
Eikeren
Flakavatnet
Geitsjøen
Halnefjorden
Hettefjorden
Juklevatnet
Kravikfjorden
Krøderen
Langesjøen
Lauvnesvatnet
Mykle
Norefjorden
Nygardsvatnet
Nyhellervatnet
Øljusjøen
Ørteren
Øvre Hein
Øyangen (Ringerike)
Pålsbufjorden
Rødungen
Samsjøen (Ringerike)
Skaupsjøen
Sperillen
Stolsvatnet
Strandavatnet
Tingvollfjorden (Buskerud)
Tinnhølen
Tisleifjorden
Tunhovdfjorden
Tyrifjorden
Ullerentjernet
Ustevatn
Vavatn
Vestre Bjonevatnet

Finnmark

Bajášjávri
Bajit Spielgajávri
Biggejávri
Bjørnstadvatnet
Čárajávri
Čorotjávri
Dátkojávri
Doggejávri
Gahččanjávri
Gákkajávri
Gardsjøen (Sør-Varanger)
Garsjøen
Gásadatjávri
Gavdnjajávri
Geađgejávri
Geašjávri
Geassájávri
Geatnjajávri
Guolehis Suolojávri
Hæmmujávri
Havvatnet
Idjajávri
Iešjávri
Juovvajávri
Kjæsvannet
Klistervatnet
Kovvatnet (Finnmark)
Láhpojávri
Latnetjávri
Nissojávri
Nuorbejávri
Rágesjávri
Sálganjávri
Soagŋojávri
Store Måsvannet
Stuora Galbajávri
Stuorajávri (Alta)
Stuorajávri (Kautokeino)
Sundvatnet
Šuoikkatjávri
Suolojávri (Kautokeino)
Suolojávri (Lebesby)
Svanevatn
Virdnejávri
Vuolit Spielgajávri

Hedmark

Atnsjøen
Digeren
Engeren
Falningsjøen
Femund
Flensjøen
Fundin
Galtsjøen
Gardsjøen (Grue)
Gjesåssjøen
Gutulisjøen
Harrsjøen
Hukusjøen
Innerdalsvatnet
Isteren
Langsjøen
Lomnessjøen
Mangen
Marsjøen
Mjøsa
Møkeren
Nedre Roasten
Nugguren
Osensjø
Råsen
Rogen
Rokosjøen
Savalen
Siksjøen
Skasen
Skjervangen
Storsjø (Nord-Odal)
Storsjøen (Rendalen)
Vermunden
Vurrusjøen

Hordaland

Askevatnet
Askjelldalsvatnet
Bjølsegrøvvatnet
Blådalsvatnet
Bondhusvatnet
Eidfjordvatnet
Evangervatnet
Finsevatnet
Flakavatnet
Gjønavatnet
Granvinsvatnet
Halnefjorden
Hamlagrøvatnet
Henangervatnet
Holmavatnet (Hordaland)
Jordalsvatnet
Juklavatnet
Kalandsvatnet
Kvennsjøen
Langavatnet (Odda)
Lille Lungegårdsvannet
Løkjelsvatnet
Lønavatnet
Nordmannslågen
Onarheimsvatnet
Oppheimsvatnet
Ringedalsvatnet
Røldalsvatnet
Sandvinvatnet
Skaupsjøen
Skjerjavatnet
Skogseidvatnet
Stakkastadvatnet
Steinslandsvatnet
Storavatnet, Laksevåg
Storavatnet, Holsnøy
Svartediket
Sysenvatnet
Taugevatn
Tinnhølen
Torfinnsvatnet
Valldalsvatnet
Vangsvatnet
Veivatnet
Vigdarvatnet
Votna

Møre og Romsdal

Aursjøen
Brusdalsvatnet
Djupvatnet
Eikesdalsvatnet
Foldsjøen
Gråsjøen
Moldevatnet
Votna

Nord-Trøndelag

Almåsgrønningen
Andorsjøen
Bangsjøan
Byavatnet
Eidsvatnet
Feren
Finnvollvatnet
Fjergen
Fossemvatnet
Funnsjøen
Gilten
Grøningen
Grungstadvatnet
Gusvatnet
Hammervatnet
Havdalsvatnet
Hoklingen
Holden (Lierne)
Holden (Verran)
Holderen
Ingjelsvatnet
Innsvatnet
Jengelvatnet
Kalvvatnet
Kingen
Kvesjøen
Laksjøen
Leksdalsvatnet
Limingen
Lysvatnet (Verran)
Mellingsvatnet
Meltingvatnet
Mjosundvatnet
Mokkavatnet
Movatnet
Murusjøen
Namsvatnet
Ormsetvatnet
Ovrejaevrie
Øyvatnet
Rengen
Saglivatnet
Salvatnet
Sandsjøen
Snåsavatnet
Sønningen
Store Øyingen
Storfrøyningen
Storgåsvatnet
Storgollomsvatnet
Storgrønningen
Stortissvatnet
Storvatnet (Leksvik)
Storvatnet (Nærøy)
Straumsetervatnet
Tunnsjøen
Tunnsjøflyan
Ulen
Veresvatnet

Nordland

Åbjørvatnet
Alsvågvatnet
Andfiskvatnet
Andkjelvatnet
Arstaddalsdammen
Balvatnet
Baugevatnet
Båvrojávrre
Bjørnefossvatnet
Blåmannsisvatnet
Bleiksvatnet
Bleikvatnet
Blerekvatnet
Bogvatnet
Børsvatnet
Daningen
Drevvatnet
Eidevatnet
Elsvatnet
Famnvatnet
Faulvatnet
Fellvatnet
Finnknevatnet
Fiskelausvatnet (Grane)
Fiskeløysvatnet (Saltdal)
Fjærvatnet
Fjellvatnet
Fjerdvatnet
Forsanvatnet
Forsvatnet
Fustvatnet
Gåsvatnet
Gautelisvatnet
Geitvatnet
Gjømmervatnet
Grasvatnet
Grovatnet
Hartvikvatnet
Heggmovatnet
Helgåvatnet
Hjertvatnet
Hopvatnet
Horndalsvatnet
Hundålvatnet
Indre Sildvikvatnet
Iptojávri
Jengelvatnet
Kaldvågvatnet
Kallvatnet
Kalvvatnet
Kilvatnet
Kjårdavatnet
Kjelvatnet (Ballangen)
Kjelvatnet (Fauske)
Kjemåvatnet
Kjerringvatnet (Hattfjelldal)
Kobbvatnet
Krutvatnet
Kvitvatnet
Låmivatnet
Langvatnet (Ballangen)
Langvatnet (Fauske)
Langvatnet (Gildeskål)
Langvatnet (Rana)
Langvatnet (Sørfold)
Langvatnet (Tysfjord)
Leirvatnet (Sørfold)
Litle Sokumvatnet
Litlumvatnet
Litlverivatnet
Livsejávrre
Lossivatnet
Luktvatnet
Lysvatnet (Meløy)
Majavatnet
Makkvatnet
Markavatnet (Meløy)
Melkevatnet
Mellingsvatnet
Mjåvatnet
Mørsvikvatnet
Muorkkejávrre
Nedre Fagervollvatnet
Nedre Fiplingvatnet
Nedre Veikvatnet
Nedrevatnet
Niingsvatnet
Nordre Bjøllåvatnet
Ømmervatnet
Överuman
Øvrevatnet
Ramsgjelvatnet
Ranseren
Raudvatnet
Reingardslivatnet
Reinoksvatnet
Rekvatnet
Rødvatnet
Røssvatnet
Rotvatnet
Røyrvatnet
Rundvatnet
Saglivatnet
Sandnesvatnet
Sausvatnet
Sealggajávri
Sefrivatnet
Siiddašjávri
Sildhopvatnet
Simskardvatnet
Sisovatnet
Skilvatnet
Skogvollvatnet
Šluŋkkajávri
Sokumvatnet
Solbjørnvatnet
Soløyvatnet
Søre Bukkevatnet
Søre Vistvatnet
Storakersvatnet
Store Svenningsvatnet
Storglomvatnet
Stormålvatnet
Stormyrbassenget
Storskogvatnet
Storvatnet (Ballangen)
Straumfjordvatnet
Straumvatnet
Strindvatnet
Trollvatnet
Unkervatnet
Unna Guovdelisjávri
Valnesvatnet
Vatnvatnet
Virvatnet
Vuolep Sårjåsjávrre

Oppland

Akksjøen
Atnsjøen
Aursjoen
Aursjøen
Avalsjøen
Bessvatnet
Breiddalsvatnet
Bukkehammartjørna
Bygdin
Dokkfløyvatn
Einavatnet
Feforvatnet
Flatningen
Fleinsendin
Gjende
Grønvatnet
Helin
Lalmsvatnet
Lemonsjøen
Lesjaskogsvatnet
Losna
Mjøsa
Nedre Heimdalsvatn
Olefjorden
Olstappen
Otrøvatnet
Øvre Leirungen
Øvre Sjodalsvatnet
Øyangen (Gran)
Øyangen (Nord-Fron)
Øyangen (Valdres)
Prestesteinsvatnet
Randsfjorden
Rauddalsvatn
Rondvatnet
Russvatnet
Samsjøen (Ringerike)
Sandvatnet/Kaldfjorden/Øyvatnet
Slettningen
Slidrefjord
Steinbusjøen
Strondafjorden
Tesse
Tisleifjorden
Tordsvatnet
Tyin
Vågåvatn
Vangsmjøse
Vestre Bjonevatnet
Vinstre

Oslo

Bogstadvannet
Lutvann
Maridalsvannet
Nordre Puttjern
Nøklevann
Østensjøvannet
Øvresetertjern
Sognsvann
Sværsvann
Tryvann

Østfold

Ara
Aspern
Femsjøen
Isesjøen
Lyseren
Mingevannet
Øgderen
Ørsjøen
Øyeren
Øymarksjøen
Rødenessjøen
Rømsjøen
Store Erte
Store Le
Vansjø
Vestvannet
Visterflo

Rogaland

Aksdalsvatnet
Austrumdalsvatnet
Blåsjø
Byrkjelandsvatnet
Edlandsvatnet
Eiavatnet
Flassavatnet
Frøylandsvatnet
Frøylandsvatnet (Sandnes)
Grøsfjellvatnet
Hofreistæ
Holmavatnet
Holmevatnet
Hovsvatnet
Limavatnet
Lundevatn
Nilsebuvatnet
Nodlandsvatnet
Oltedalsvatnet
Orrevatnet
Ørsdalsvatnet
Øvre Tysdalsvatnet
Stakkastadvatnet
Stokkavatnet (Forus)
Suldalsvatnet
Svartevatnet
Teksevatnet
Tysdalsvatnet
Vatsvatnet
Vigdarvatnet
Vostervatnet

Sogn og Fjordane

Austdalsvatnet
Breimsvatn
Degnepollvatnet
Dingevatn
Eldrevatnet
Emhjellevatnet
Endestadvatnet
Fretheimsdalsvatnet
Hafslovatnet
Holsavatnet
Holskardvatnet
Hornindalsvatnet
Jølstravatn
Juklevatnet
Lovatnet
Nyhellervatnet
Øljusjøen
Oppstrynsvatn
Prestesteinsvatnet
Styggevatnet
Tyin

Sør-Trøndelag

Aursund
Benna
Bolagen
Botn (Sør-Trøndelag)
Esandsjø
Femund
Feragen
Flensjøen
Fundin
Gagnåsvatnet
Gjevilvatnet
Håsjøen
Hostovatnet
Jonsvatnet
Korssjøen
Malmsjøen
Nedre Roasten
Nesjø
Øyangsvatnet
Øyungen
Rambergsjøen
Riasten
Rien
Rogen
Samsjøen (Sør-Trøndelag)
Selbusjø
Sørungen
Stordalsvatnet
Storvatnet (Leksvik)
Straumsetervatnet
Svorksjøen
Vasslivatnet
Våvatnet

Telemark

Bandak
Bolkesjø
Farris
Flåvatn
Fyresvatn
Holmavatnet
Kalhovdfjorden
Kviteseidvatn
Lake Tinn
Møsvatn
Nisser
Norsjø
Seljordsvatnet
Songevatnet
Toke
Totak

Troms

Altevatnet
Geavdnjajávri
Leinavatn
Lille Rostavatn
Lysvatnet (Lenvik)
Niingsvatnet
Prestvannet
Rihpojávri
Rostojávri
Šuoikkatjávri

Vest-Agder

3. Stampe
Gillsvannet
Gjuvvatnet
Gravatnet
Gyvatn
Juvatn
Kilefjorden
Kulivatnet
Kumlevollvatnet
Kvifjorden
Lundevatn
Lygne
Nåvatnet
Øre
Øyarvatnet
Rosskreppfjorden
Selura
Sirdalsvatnet
Svartevatnet
Valevatn
Venneslafjorden
Vollevannet
Ytre Øydnavatnet

Vestfold

Eikeren
Farris
Goksjø
Hallevatnet

See also

Geography of Norway
List of rivers in Norway

References

Norway
Lakes